Busy Bodies is a 1933 short comedy film starring Laurel and Hardy.

Plot
Stan and Ollie are in high spirits as they drive in an old Model T to their new jobs at the sawmill. Laurel turns on the car radio (at the time a luxury item in newer cars, not expected in an old jalopy); the 'radio' is revealed to be a wind-up phonograph stashed under the car hood. Arriving at the sawmill, a slapstick sequence has them repeatedly walking into planks of wood. Starting work, Stan soon traps Ollie's hands in a window frame. After freeing him, they trick a shop worker (Charlie Hall) into smoking despite a "No Smoking" sign. Stan then tears a strip off Ollie's pants with a plane and in the resulting 'tit for tat' dips a paintbrush in glue and sticks it onto Ollie's chin. Finding it is not possible to pull it off he prepares like a barber and shaves it with a plane. Ollie then gets propelled through a ventilator duct and out of an attic vent port.

Stan climbs a ladder to help him out. A barrel of shellac is kicked down the ventilator shaft and knocks Ollie out of the vent port: the ladder topples over with them both on it. Down below, two men see the ladder falling towards them. One falls into some whitewash while the other hides in a shed, which proves to be a bad idea when the duo crash onto the shed, demolishing it. As Laurel helps Hardy out of the wreckage, there is a knocking from beneath the door. The man they help out proves to be their foreman, who was the one who sought cover in the shed. They beat a hasty retreat. The foreman would have run after them, but he was crowned by the barrel coming out of the vent port. Attempting to flee, their car gets sawed in two lengthwise by a large band saw whilst they remain seated in it. The two fall out of the collapsing wreckage. Laurel finds the phonograph still intact and plays a record. Hardy is singularly unimpressed by music now, and chases Laurel.

Cast
 Stan Laurel as Stan
 Oliver Hardy as Ollie
 Dick Gilbert as Shoveler
 Charlie Hall as Shop Worker
 Tiny Sandford as Shop Foreman
 Jack Hill as Shop Worker
 Charley Young as Shop Worker

References

External links
 
 
 

1933 films
1933 comedy films
American black-and-white films
1930s English-language films
Films directed by Lloyd French
Laurel and Hardy (film series)
1933 short films
American comedy short films
1930s American films